Margaret Rickert (May 5, 1888 – 1973) was an American art historian and World War II codebreaker. In 1954, she became the first American and first woman to author a volume in the original series of the Pelican History of Art with her title, Painting in Britain: The Middle Ages.  She was the sister of art historian Edith Rickert.

Born in 1888, Richert earned her Ph.D. from the University of Chicago in 1938.  Her dissertation was on the reconstruction of an English Carmelite missal from a scrapbook housed in the British Museum.  In 1952, she published a book based on this dissertation.

During World War II, Rickert worked as a codebreaker for the U.S. Army Signal Corps in Washington, D.C.

Rickert died in 1973.  Her papers are housed at the University of Chicago Library.

Published works
Rickert, Margaret J. Painting in Britain: The Middle Ages. Baltimore: Penguin Books, 1963.
Rickert, Margaret J, and Philip A. Hanrott. The Reconstructed Carmelite Missal: An English Manuscript of the Late XIV Century in the British Museum (additional 29704-5, 44892). London: Faber and Faber, 1952.
Rickert, Margaret J. The So-Called Beaufort Hours and York Psalter. London, 1962.

References

External links 

1888 births
1973 deaths
University of Chicago alumni
American military personnel of World War II